Chapter Clerk is the title usually given to the officer responsible for the administrative support to the Chapter of a cathedral or collegiate church in the Church of England. 

The post is usually occupied by a laity but may occasionally be carried out by someone who is ordained. Some cathedrals refer to their Chapter Clerks as Chapter Steward or occasionally Managing Director.

References

Church of England ecclesiastical polity
Ecclesiastical titles